WCTB is an FM radio broadcast station licensed to Fairfield, Maine, USA, with studios in Skowhegan. It broadcasts on 93.5 MHz with a classic country format.

History
WCTB originally signed on as an adult contemporary music station in 1993. In the late 1990s, the station went through several format changes, at times simulcasting the sports talk of WSKW and country music (both classic and current country) simulcasted on WCME (now WBQA).

In late 2003, when Clear Channel Broadcasting lost control of the station, WCTB began to stunt with Christmas music (as they had done every year from Thanksgiving to Christmas). In January 2004, the station began airing an eclectic mix of music, finally ending up with a classic hits format in April 2004.

With another ownership change in November 2004, WCTB changed to Christmas music again and after Christmas adopted a classic rock format that it kept until December 2010.

On December 27, 2018, WCTB changed its format from oldies to classic country, branded as "Cruisin' Country 93.5".

On March 22, 2022, WCTB changed its branding to "True Country 93.5".

Programming
WCTB currently carries classic country with local programming and John Tesh nights. In January 2011, WSKW changed to a simulcast of WCTB, previously having simulcast the WSKW oldies format as Legacy 1160. WSKW changed to ESPN Radio the next month, which it had carried until September 2009.

Former on-air slogans
 The River 93.5 (1993–1999, 2004, 2005–2010): adult contemporary music (1993–1999), classic hits (2004) and classic rock (2005–2010)
 The Score (1999): for a few months in 1999 when it simulcasted the sports programming of WSKW
 Kicks Country (1999–2001): WCTB and WCME changed to country when Clear Channel bought the station, moving the adult contemporary music to WKCG
 C-93 (2001–2003): classic country
 Central Maine's Christmas Station (1993–2004): the station frequently used this on air slogan when it changed to Christmas music every year
93.5 The Edge (2010): similar to The River but focused more on 1980s and 1990s rock
Cruisin' 93.5 (2010-2018): playing 1960s and 1970s oldies.
Cruisin' Country (2018-2022): classic country.

Affiliated stations
WFMX "Mix 107.9"
WSKW "Legacy 1160"

Previous logo

References

External links

CTB
Somerset County, Maine
Classic country radio stations in the United States
Radio stations established in 1993
1993 establishments in Maine